Nicușor Răzvan Bănică (born 7 January 1984) is a Romanian former footballer who played as a goalkeeper for teams such as FC U Craiova, Poiana Câmpina, FC Drobeta Turnu-Severin or Metalurgistul Cugir, among others. In 2010, for a short period, he was the assistant manager of Pandurii II Târgu Jiu.

Honours
CSO Cugir
Liga III: 2020–21

References

External links
 

1984 births
Living people
People from Balș
Romanian footballers
Association football goalkeepers
Liga I players
Liga II players
Liga III players
FC U Craiova 1948 players
FCM Câmpina players
CS Minerul Lupeni players
FC Drobeta-Turnu Severin players
CS Pandurii Târgu Jiu players
CS Minerul Motru players
Romanian expatriate footballers
Romanian expatriate sportspeople in England
Expatriate footballers in England